Debbie Smith (January 14, 1956 – February 21, 2016) was an American politician who served as a member of the Nevada Senate for District 13.

Career 
Smith served on the Lander County School Board. Smith has served as President of the Nevada Parent Teacher Association. Smith was a retired Benefits Information Representative for the International Union of Operating Engineers.

Smith had previously served as a member of the Nevada State Assembly from District 30. In the Assembly, Smith served as an Assistant Majority Whip in the 74th and 75th Regular Legislative Session (2007–2009) and Speaker Pro Tempore in the 76th Regular Legislative Session in 2011.

Personal life 
She lived in Sparks, Nevada. Smith died of brain cancer in Reno, Nevada, on February 21, 2016. Her widower, Greg Smith, would later serve briefly in the seat which she had held.

Electoral history

References

External links
Follow the Money - Debbie Smith campaign contributions
2008, 2006, 2004, 2002, 2000
Assemblywoman Debbie Smith official government website

Democratic Party members of the Nevada Assembly
Democratic Party Nevada state senators
School board members in Nevada
Women state legislators in Nevada
1956 births
2016 deaths
Politicians from Sparks, Nevada
Politicians from Tucson, Arizona
21st-century American politicians
21st-century American women politicians
Deaths from brain tumor